During the 1944–45 Scottish football season, Celtic competed in the Southern Football League.

Results

Southern Football League

Summer Cup

Southern League Cup

References

Celtic F.C. seasons
Celtic